Joseph Ellis-Stephenson (born 19 October 1988), better known by his stage name Dot Rotten or Zeph Ellis, is a British grime MC, rapper, singer, songwriter and record producer from Lambeth, South London.

Having released a series of mixtapes independently in the grime scene under the names Young Dot and later Dot Rotten, Ellis signed to Mercury Records, releasing his debut studio album Voices in My Head in 2013. After leaving the major label, he has since released several independent EP's and projects, as well as later changing his name to Zeph Ellis and focusing on producing.

He is known for introducing various sampling techniques to grime production, and creating the style of singing hooks on grime tracks. These styles can be heard throughout his discography from the early Young Dot era to his present projects under the Zeph Ellis moniker.

Biography

2004–08: Early career and first name change
Ellis began rapping at the age of seven, using an Atari model as a basis for music production. Under the name Young Dot, he released his first self-produced mixtape in 2007, entitled This Is The Beginning.

The following year saw Ellis abandon the moniker and adopt a new guise, Dot Rotten. The name change was followed by a second self-produced mixtape entitled R.I.P. Young Dot, released in July 2008. This year also saw the release of Rotten Riddims, an instrumental series spanning six volumes. These featured a host of new material, as well as instrumentals that Ellis had previously made and used in his Young Dot era. Volume 7 was eventually released in 2014 as a free download.

2008–11: Mixtapes and collaborations

The following year, Ellis released two mixtapes within two months, entitled S.O.O.N (Something Out of Nothing) and Extra Attention. Production was primarily handled by Dot himself, but also featured instrumentals by Rude Kid, Faith SFX and Dizzee Rascal. Guest vocalists included Ice Kid, MEGA12, Voltage, Brutal and Shimmer.

2011–13: Breakthrough and Voices in My Head
2011 saw Dot Rotten sign his first major label deal with Mercury Records. During this year he made several guest appearances, including on Ed Sheeran's No. 5 Collaborations Project ("Goodbye to You"), Mz. Bratt's Elements mixtape ("Speeding By") and Cher Lloyd's Sticks + Stones ("Dub on the Track"). He also appeared on the Children in Need 2011 charity single, "Teardrop". Under the name 'The Collective', Rotten appeared as one of many artists assembled by Take That member Gary Barlow, which included Chipmunk, Wretch 32, Mz. Bratt, Labrinth, Rizzle Kicks, Ed Sheeran, Ms. Dynamite and Tulisa Contostavlos. The single, which was performed both at Children in Need 2011 and Children in Need Rocks Manchester in November 2011 debuted at number 24 on the UK Singles Chart; marking Dot Rotten's first chart appearance. An EP entitled Above The Waves was self-released in June 2014 featuring the lead track, "Normal Human Being".

The rapper proceeded to release his debut single on 4 November 2011, entitled "Keep It on a Low". It was announced on 5 December that Dot Rotten had been nominated for the BBC's poll Sound of 2012. The rapper's second single, "Are You Not Entertained?" was released on 4 March 2012, following a premiere from BBC Radio 1 DJ Zane Lowe on 4 January. "Are You Not Entertained?" debuted at number fifty-three on the UK Singles Chart and number twenty-one on the UK R&B Chart – marking Rotten's first chart appearance as a solo artist. The rapper's third single, "Overload", was released in the United Kingdom on 28 May 2012. Sampling the 1996 number-two hit "Children", by Robert Miles, the track was selected as Zane Lowe's Hottest Record in the World. "Overload" debuted at number fifteen on the UK chart, also debuting at number three on the R&B chart. In march 2013 Dot Rotten featured on Kid Bookie's "Evolution" produced by Flava D alongside Griminal, Brotherhood, Pawz and Maxsta. His debut studio album, Voices in My Head, was released in the United Kingdom on 6 May 2013. Despite the successful singles, due to issues with the label, the album was neglected by Dot himself and it only managed to chart at number 146 on the UK Albums Chart. A free mixtape entitled Throwback Music was released soon after, consisting of songs that didn't make the final cut of the album.

2013: Interview and name change
After leaving his label deal, Minfection EP was released in January 2014. Ellis then proceeded to put out his self-released album Interview featuring artists including Sickman, Stylo G, Lady Leshurr and Abel Miller.

Taking a break from rapping, Ellis changed his stage name to Zeph Ellis and focused on production, releasing various instrumental projects including the This Side of Grime series. He produced an instrumental titled "XCXD BXMB" which featured on the fabriclive.83 mix CD. It was used as the basis for Kano's "Garage Skank" from Made in the Manor, and AJ Tracey's "Naila" from the Alex Moran EP. Ellis also produced Jammer's 2016 single "Dagenham Dave."

Feud with JAY1
In November 2019, his original alias 'Dot Rotten' made a comeback to the UK rap scene with a diss track aimed towards a UK rap artist named JAY1 (real name Jason Michael). A disagreement regarding the cost of production was the cause of the feud. JAY1 refused pay £15,000 to Dot Rotten for the production costs one of JAY1's songs: 'Million Bucks' which created the feud. It was revealed that the price had gone up from £10,000 to £15,000 due to not receiving an invitation to the music video shoot of 'Million Bucks'. Jay1 disagreed to pay the fees, and Dot Rotten took to social media to expose the situation. After numerous discussions regarding the dispute, Jay1's management team paid the £15,000 production costs to Dot Rotten, and 'Million Bucks' was released on 5 December 2019.  "4AM in the Morgue" was released on 25 November at 4am. A follow-up record entitled 'Original Real Talk' followed on 30 November 2019, addressing other industry politics.

Feud with Sneakbo
On 20 February 2020, Sneakbo posted on Twitter about Dot Rotten "in my DM talking crazy" and advising "if you know Dot Rotten, please go check on your guy before he overdose on something... please check on your guy. No joke". The same day there was apparently a confrontation between the two men, with Sneakbo posting on Instagram a picture of what appears to be Dot Rotten being held by the neck; the caption read "I don't make Diss (sic) tracks [...] when you catch the lad that's been dissing you for years inna (sic) real life... he's not even worth a beating. I just had to tell him off! This is what happens when you mention my son". Dot Rotten responded the same day, cancelling an appearance at Brixton, Sneakbo's home, calling Sneakbo a "snitch" (and "Snitchbo"), and saying "I hate predicting death.. (sic) But we're gonna lose a rapper from Brixton soon."

Discography

Studio albums

Mixtapes

Extended plays

Singles

As featured artist

Guest appearances

Music videos
This list is incomplete

Awards and nominations

Tours
 No More Idols Tour (2011) (as supporting act)
 Cole World... World Tour (2011) (as supporting act)
 Dappy Tour (2011) (as supporting act)

Notes

References

External links

1987 births
Living people
Grime music artists
Dot Rotten
Rappers from London
Black British male rappers
People from Stockwell